Payneway (formerly Harrisburg Corner) is an unincorporated community and census-designated place (CDP) in Little River Township, Poinsett County, Arkansas, United States. It is located west of Marked Tree near the intersection of Arkansas Highway 463 (formerly U.S. Route 63) and Arkansas Highway 14. It was first listed as a CDP in the 2020 census with a population of 241.

Demographics

2020 census

Note: the US Census treats Hispanic/Latino as an ethnic category. This table excludes Latinos from the racial categories and assigns them to a separate category. Hispanics/Latinos can be of any race.

References

Unincorporated communities in Poinsett County, Arkansas
Unincorporated communities in Arkansas
Census-designated places in Arkansas
Census-designated places in Poinsett County, Arkansas